Abd al-Mawla Naqi (1931 – 2 January 2022) was a Libyan politician.

Biography
He was a member of the House of Representatives from 1960 to 1964 and was Minister of Labor and Social Affairs from 1961 to 1963 and again from 1964 to 1965. He died on 2 January 2022, at the age of 90.

References

1931 births
2022 deaths
Government ministers of Libya
Libyan politicians
Members of the House of Representatives (Libya)
People from Benghazi